The Nissan Frontier is a nameplate used by Nissan in several regions as an alternative to the Navara and NP300 nameplates. In North America, the nameplate was used from 1997 to 2021, replacing the Hardbody. Since 2021, the Frontier sold in the US and Canada has been made a separate model distinct from the globally marketed Navara/Frontier. It is larger and developed to cater to the needs of the North American market.



Parallel models (D22, D40; 1997–2021) 

The D22 Frontier was introduced in the US and Canada in 1997 to replace the D21 Hardbody. In other markets, the D22 Frontier is also called the Navara, NP300, Hardbody, or PickUp, among others. It was replaced by the D40 Frontier in 2004 for the 2005 model year, which was produced in the US for both the US and Canadian markets up to the 2021 model year. Both generations were mostly identical to the global version offered by Nissan elsewhere, with minor changes for the North American market.

When the D23 Navara was introduced for the global market in 2014, a Nissan North America spokesperson restated that the D23 is not indicative of a D40 Frontier replacement for the North American market.

Standalone model (D41; 2022) 

The first dedicated Frontier model for the North American market, not shared with the global model, was unveiled on February 4, 2021 as the third-generation model for the 2022 model year. The vehicle rides on a revised high-strength steel ladder frame chassis carried over from the outgoing model. It is offered in extended King Cab and crew-cab layouts with either rear- or four-wheel drive, and five- and six-foot cargo box length options.

Trim levels include base S, SV, Pro-X, and top-spec Pro-4X. In the United States, the King Cab (extended cab) is offered with two- or four-wheel drive in either S or SV trim, paired to a 6.1-foot bed. The crew cab is available with two- or four-wheel drive in the S and SV trims, while four-wheel drive is standard on the Pro-4X. In Canada, a two-wheel drive model is not offered, with four-wheel drive being the only option, regardless of trim level. The Pro-4X trim receives a rear electronic locking differential, Bilstein off-road shocks, and underbody skid plates as standard.

This version is sold in Mexico alongside the D23 Frontier which has been offered in the country since 2014. Its launch for the Mexican market was confirmed by Nissan's Mexican division on 9 August 2021 as a competitor to the Toyota Tacoma and the Chevrolet Colorado. It is sold under the "Frontier V6 Pro-4X" naming to distinguish itself from the D23 Frontier. It went on sale on 29 September 2021. Only the Pro-4X version is offered in Mexico as the D23 is used for the non Pro-4X models.

References

External links 

 Official website (United States)

Frontier (North America)
Cars introduced in 1997
2000s cars
2010s cars
2020s cars
Pickup trucks
Rear-wheel-drive vehicles
All-wheel-drive vehicles
Off-road vehicles
Motor vehicles manufactured in the United States